is a Japanese anime screenwriter and artist who is well known for his work in the .hack franchise and his writing for the 1995 Ghost in the Shell movie. Itō supervised the writing for the novel, .hack//Another Birth which was written by his student, Miu Kawasaki. He is a member of the artist group known as Headgear. Helen McCarthy in 500 Essential Anime Movies calls him "one of the best screenwriters in anime".

Filmography

External links
  
 Kazunori Ito at Media Arts Database 
 
 

1954 births
Living people
Japanese screenwriters
Anime screenwriters
Special effects people
Tokusatsu
People from Yamagata Prefecture
Waseda University alumni